Caruana is a surname, commonly found in Italy, Sicily and Malta. Notable people with the surname include:

 Alfonso Caruana (born 1946), member of the Sicilian Mafia
 Antonio Annetto Caruana (1830–1905), Maltese archaeologist and author
 Charles Caruana (1932–2010), Roman Catholic Bishop of Gibraltar
 Christian Caruana (born 1986), Maltese international footballer who plays as a midfielder
 Cuntrera-Caruana Mafia clan, part of the Sicilian Mafia or Cosa Nostra
 Daphne Caruana Galizia (1964–2017), Maltese investigative journalist
 Fabiano Caruana (born 1992), Italian-American  chess grandmaster
 Francesco Saverio Caruana (1759–1847), Maltese prelate
 Gabriel Caruana (born 1929), Maltese artist and ceramicist
 George Caruana (1831–1872), Maltese philosopher
 George J. Caruana (1882–1951), Archbishop, Vatican diplomat
 Jaime Caruana (born 1952), BIS employee
 John Caruana (1866–1923), Maltese lawyer and philosopher
 John Caruana (footballer) (born 1961), Maltese footballer
 Jonathan Caruana (born 1986), footballer
 Laurence Caruana (born 1962), Maltese artist, writer and lecturer
 Lydia Caruana, Maltese operatic soprano
 Maurus Caruana (1867–1943), Roman Catholic Bishop of Malta
 Oana Caruana Pulpan (born 1978), Maltese chess player
 Orlando E. Caruana (1844–1917), Medal of Honor recipient
 Patrick P. Caruana (born 1939), United States Air Force lieutenant general
 Peter Caruana, (born 1956), Gibraltarian politician and Chief Minister of Gibraltar
 Raymond Caruana, Maltese Nationalist Party activist, murdered in 1986
 Vinnie Caruana (born 1979), American singer

Italian-language surnames
Maltese-language surnames